The Michigan State–Penn State football rivalry is an American college football rivalry between the Michigan State Spartans and Penn State Nittany Lions. The Land Grant Trophy is presented to the winner of the game. Penn State leads 17-10 since joining the Big Ten. The series is tied at 18–18-1, with Penn State winning the most recent matchup in 2022.

Series history
When Penn State joined the Big Ten Conference in 1993, the Nittany Lions and Spartans were designated as permanent rivals, and met each other for the trophy in the last week of conference play. The trophy, designed by former Michigan State coach George Perles, features pictures of Penn State's Old Main and Michigan State's Beaumont Tower, as well as figurines of The Spartan and Nittany Lion Shrine statues. The trophy is infamous for its unwieldiness and hodgepodge appearance.

On September 24, 2005 during Michigan week, a couple of Penn State students brazenly defaced the newly installed bronze Sparty statue.  “It happened during broad daylight, with people all around” according to MSU police Sgt. Randy Holton. The statue was splattered with blue paint and the base tagged with the letters PSU. The perpetrators were able to evade capture despite the incident occurring in the middle of the day, during the traditional period of time when the statue is guarded by MSU student employees and Spartan Marching Band members, in what is called Sparty Watch.

In 2011, Nebraska joined the Big Ten, and the conference split into two divisions.  Michigan State was in the Legends division and Penn State was in the Leaders division, so they no longer played each other annually. Instead, Indiana and Nebraska were designated as Michigan State and Penn State's permanent rivals, respectively. Under this setup, Penn State and Michigan State would compete on average two out of every five years, but the two teams did not play against each other during the three years that this system was in effect (2011–13).

In 2014, when Maryland and Rutgers joined the Big Ten, the conference was realigned into two geographically-based divisions, East and West. Michigan State and Penn State are both in the East division, and thus resumed a yearly series. 

Michigan State University followed by Penn State University are the nation's oldest land-grant universities, hence the name for the trophy. In 1955 on the 100th anniversary of the founding of the land grant system, Michigan State and Penn State were commemorated on a U.S. postage stamp honoring the "First of the Land-Grant Colleges". These two universities were the first ever universities to be placed on a U.S. postage stamp.

They are the 4th and 5th most recently joined members of the Big Ten, after Nebraska, who joined in 2011, Maryland and Rutgers, who both joined in 2014. Fellow Big Ten members Illinois, Minnesota, Ohio State, Purdue and Wisconsin are also land-grant schools.

Game results

See also  
 List of NCAA college football rivalry games

References

External links
 "Land Grant Trophy: a case of envy", Frantz, Jeff, The Daily Collegian, November 23, 2002

Awards established in 1993
College football rivalries in the United States
Michigan State Spartans football
Penn State Nittany Lions football
Big Ten Conference rivalries